Cerro Gordo, nicknamed Fat Hill, is a town in Piatt County, Illinois, United States. The population was 1,316 at the 2020 census.

Geography

History
When the Mexican American War began General John S. Williams took command. At the battle of Cerro Gordo (Mexico) he led the troops in a victory over Mexican troops. He took the nickname of "Cerro Gordo" Williams. After the battle, he returned to Illinois and settled in Bement. About the same time (1855) the people of the town of Griswold chose to move the town from the stagecoach line along the river to the path of the Great Western Railroad. The town was platted by Sheridan Wait and Henry Durfee. "Cerro Gordo" Williams was one of the citizens, as they had other citizens that fought in the battle of Cerro Gordo, they selected the name Cerro Gordo. When the Civil War erupted, "Cerro Gordo" Williams returned to Kentucky and became a general in the Army of the Confederacy. On May 31, 1864, his residence was destroyed by fire, with arson being suspected. After the Civil War "Cerro Gordo" Williams having nothing to return to, moved to a farm near Mount Sterling, KY and served in the Kentucky legislature.

Cerro Gordo was the birthplace of Charlie Taylor, an inventor and mechanic who created the engine used in the first powered flight by the Wright Brothers in 1903.  It is also the hometown of former college football player and noted snowboarding enthusiast Bryson Davis.

Demographics

As of the census of 2000, there were 1,436 people, 560 households, and 417 families residing in the village. The racial makeup of the village was 99.65% White, 0.14% African American, 0.07% Asian, and 0.14% from two or more races. Hispanic or Latino of any race were 0.07% of the population.

There were 0 households, out of which 0% had children under the age of 18 living with them, 59.1% were married couples living together, 11.8% had a female householder with no husband present, and 25.4% were non-families. 22.3% of all households were made up of individuals, and 11.6% had someone living alone who was 65 years of age or older. The average household size was 2.56 and the average family size was 3.00.

In the village, the population was spread out, with 27.8% under the age of 18, 7.8% from 18 to 24, 29.4% from 25 to 44, 20.6% from 45 to 64, and 14.4% who were 65 years of age or older. The median age was 37 years. For every 100 females, there were 93.8 males. For every 100 females age 18 and over, there were 90.6 males.

The median income for a household in the village was $40,529, and the median income for a family was $45,250. Males had a median income of $34,408 versus $24,219 for females. The per capita income for the village was $16,635. About 7.4% of families and 7.1% of the population were below the poverty line, including 7.9% of those under age 18 and 8.3% of those age 65 or over.

Notable residents
David W. Tucker, musician, educator, director of University of California Jazz Ensembles

Gallery

References

External links
Official website of Cerro Gordo, Illinois

Villages in Piatt County, Illinois
Villages in Illinois